Jack Hillier (10 September 1933 – 9 May 2006) was an English footballer, who played as a goalkeeper in the Football League for Chester.

References

Chester City F.C. players
Bootle Athletic F.C. players
Association football goalkeepers
English Football League players
1933 births
2006 deaths
People from Halsall
English footballers